Asaria is the surname of a large and notable family. The family's origin can be traced back to Gujarat, India. From there a large portion of them migrated to East Africa - namely to Mombasa, Kenya; Kampala, Uganda and to Dar es Salaam, Tanzania.
Asaria surname had its origin when a group of people from kutch ran away from there due to fear of king and reached Jamnagar and the nearby. On reaching Jamnagar they had said asarawiya' meaning "We are saved".

There are also some Asaria who had migrated to Burundi, Democratic Republic of the Congo, Madagascar and Pakistan.

Surnames